Puttur Assembly constituency was an assembly constituency of the Madras Legislative Assembly till States Reorganisation Act, 1956 Andhra Pradesh Legislative Assembly, India. It was one of constituencies in the Chittoor district.

Overview
It was part of the Chittoor Lok Sabha constituency.

Members of Legislative Assembly

Madras State
1951: Kumaraswamy Rajah Bahadur (Raja of Karvetnagar), Kisan Mazdoor Praja Party
1952 (Bye-Polls): RBV Sundarsana Varma, Indian National Congress

Andhra State
1955: Tarimela Ramachandrareddi, Indian National Congress

Andhra Pradesh

2008 onwards: Nagari. This Assembly constituency was merged with neighbouring Nagari seat. The longest serving legislator of this erstwhile Puttur constituency Mr.Gali Muddukrishnama Naidu got elected from Nagari in 2009 elections and lost against Actress turned Politician RK Roja in 2014 elections.

Election results

1952

See also
 List of constituencies of Andhra Pradesh Legislative Assembly

References

Former assembly constituencies of Andhra Pradesh